The 1896 Kansas gubernatorial election was held on November 3, 1896. People's Party nominee John W. Leedy defeated incumbent Republican Edmund Needham Morrill with 50.55% of the vote.

General election

Candidates
Major party candidates 
Edmund Needham Morrill, Republican

Other candidates
John W. Leedy, People's
Horace Hurley, Prohibition
Henry L. Douthart, National Prohibition
A. E. Kepford, Independent Prohibition

Results

References

1896
Kansas
Gubernatorial